Presidency of George Bush may refer to:
 Presidency of George H. W. Bush, the United States presidential administration from 1989 to 1993
 Presidency of George W. Bush, the United States presidential administration from 2001 to 2009

See also
 President Bush (disambiguation)
 George Bush (disambiguation)
 Bush (disambiguation)